Francisco Benítez (born 26 March 1962 in Madrid) is a physically disabled S6 swimmer from Spain. He competed at the 1972 Summer Paralympics, earning a silver in two different swimming races.

References

External links 
 
 

1962 births
Living people
Spanish male backstroke swimmers
Spanish male freestyle swimmers
Paralympic swimmers of Spain
Paralympic silver medalists for Spain
Paralympic medalists in swimming
Swimmers at the 1972 Summer Paralympics
Medalists at the 1972 Summer Paralympics
Swimmers from Madrid